Jeffrey Read (born 1 October 1997) is a Canadian World Cup alpine ski racer. He specializes in the speed events of downhill and super-G, and made his World Cup debut in January 2018.

Read is the son of alpine ski racer Ken Read (b.1955), one of the Crazy Canucks and winner of five World Cup downhill races. Older brother Erik (b.1991) is also a World Cup alpine racer, specializing in the technical events.

World Cup results

Season standings

Top twenty finishes

 0 podiums, 2 top tens (1 DH, 1 SG)

World Championship results

References

External links
 
 
 Jeffrey Read at Alpine Canada

1997 births
Living people
Canadian male alpine skiers
Skiers from Calgary